The Vicky Metcalf Award for Literature for Young People, colloquially called the Vicky, is given annually at the Writers' Trust Awards to a writer or illustrator whose body of work has been "inspirational to Canadian youth". It has been presented since 1963. Before 2013, the prize was known as the Vicky Metcalf Award for Children's Literature.

In 2002, the award was taken over by the Writers' Trust of Canada from the Canadian Authors Association.

Award winners

1963 - Kerry Wood
1964 - John F. Hayes
1965 - Roderick Haig-Brown 
1966 - Fred Savage
1967 - John Patrick Gillese
1968 - Lorraine McLaughlin
1969 - Audrey McKim
1970 - Farley Mowat
1971 - Kay Hill
1972 - William Toye
1973 - Christie Harris
1974 - Jean Little
1975 - Lyn Harrington
1976 - Suzanne Martel
1977 - James Archibald Houston
1978 - Lyn Cook
1979 - Cliff Faulknor 
1980 - John Craig
1981 - Monica Hughes
1982 - Janet Lunn
1983 - Claire Mackay
1984 - Bill Freeman
1985 - Edith Fowke
1986 - Dennis Lee
1987 - Robert Munsch
1988 - Barbara Smucker
1989 - Stéphane Poulin
1990 - Bernice Thurman Hunter
1991 - Brian Doyle
1992 - Kevin Major
1993 - Phoebe Gilman
1994 - Welwyn Wilton Katz
1995 - Sarah Ellis
1996 - Margaret Buffie 
1997 - Tim Wynne-Jones 
1998 - Kit Pearson
1999 - Joan Clark
2000 - Sheree Fitch
2001 - Linda Granfield
2002 - Julie Johnston
2003 - Roslyn Schwartz
2004 - Deborah Ellis
2005 - Marie-Louise Gay
2006 - Kenneth Oppel
2007 - Martha Brooks
2008 - Michael Kusugak
2009 - Marthe Jocelyn
2010 - Polly Horvath
2011 - Iain Lawrence
2012 - Paul Yee
2013 - Barbara Reid
2014 - Cary Fagan
2015 - Jan Thornhill
2016 - Alan Cumyn
2017 - Ruby Slipperjack
2018 - Christopher Paul Curtis
2019 - Susin Nielsen
2020 - Marianne Dubuc
2021 - Linda Bailey
2022 - Elise Gravel

References

External links
CAA VM award page 
Writers' Trust of Canada

Writers' Trust of Canada awards
Awards established in 1963
1963 establishments in Canada
Canadian children's literary awards